The Voice UK is a British television music competition to find new singing talent. The ninth series began airing on 4 January 2020, presented by Emma Willis on ITV. will.i.am, Sir Tom Jones and Olly Murs returned for their ninth, eighth and third series, respectively, as coaches. Jennifer Hudson did not return as a coach for this series and was replaced by singer-songwriter Meghan Trainor. A promotional trailer was released on 6 December 2019.

Due to the COVID-19 pandemic, the semi-final and final of the competition, originally meant to air on 28 March and 4 April, were postponed until November 2020.

In September 2020, ITV revealed that the series would continue in October 2020. However, Trainor digitally coached from the United States because of travel restrictions due to her pregnancy and the ongoing pandemic.

On 14 November 2020, Blessing Chitapa was announced the winner of the season, making her the first winner to be born outside of the UK as Chitapa was born in Zimbabwe. In addition, she became the youngest winner in the show's history, surpassing Molly Hocking the year before. This also marks the second consecutive win of Olly Murs.

Coaches  

On 26 September 2019, it was confirmed that will.i.am, Sir Tom Jones and Olly Murs would return to the show as coaches for their ninth, eighth and third series, respectively. They are joined by new coach Meghan Trainor, an American Grammy Award winning singer-songwriter, who replaces former coach Jennifer Hudson. Hudson opted not to return for her fourth series due to filming commitments in the US, which is Cats and Respect. Trainor expressed her excitement at joining the coaching team and commented, "It's a dream come true and I can't wait to sit in the chair with my own button and listen to some incredible new talent!" Alongside the coaches, the return of presenter Emma Willis was announced; she was excited by Trainor's casting.

Trainor later spoke about joining the coaching panel, admitting that she found it "intimidating" and felt "insecure" about what the contestants would think about her, believing she was not as well established in comparison to the rest of the panel. She added that she was nervous about replacing Hudson and asked her for advice on how to approach the show. will.i.am thought it was hard for Trainor to settle into the position because Hudson was well loved on the show, but believed that Trainor would be liked by the audience too. Murs agreed and described Trainor as "a very powerful woman, she's got this great energy about her, she's fun."

Production 
Filming for this series commenced on 14 October 2019 at Dock 10 studios with the taping of the blind auditions.

A promotional trailer for the series was released on 6 December 2019, featuring the coaching panel. The series premiered on ITV on 4 January 2020 in the 20:30 timeslot.

On 18 March, it was announced by ITV that the live semi-final which was scheduled for Saturday 28 March, would be postponed until later in the year due to the COVID-19 pandemic. The semi-final eventually was aired on 7 November, and the final on 14 November.

Teams 
Colour key:
  Winner
  Runner-up
  Third place
  Eliminated in the Semi-Final
  Eliminated in the Knockouts
  Artist was stolen by another coach at the Battles
  Eliminated in the Battles

Blind auditions
Colour key

Episode 1 (4 January)

Episode 2 (11 January)

Episode 3 (18 January)

Episode 4 (25 January)

Episode 5 (1 February)

Episode 6 (8 February)

Episode 7 (15 February)

Battle rounds

Colour key

Episode 1 (22 February)

Episode 2 (29 February)

Episode 3 (7 March)

Knockouts

Episode 1 (14 March)

Episode 2 (21 March)

Live shows

Results summary
Team's colour key
 Team Will
 Team Meghan
 Team Tom
 Team Olly

Result's colour key
 Artist received the most public votes
 Artist received the fewest votes and was eliminated

Week 1: Semi-final (7 November)
Musical guest: Molly Hocking ("After the Night Before")

Week 2: Final (14 November)
Musical guest: Celeste ("A Little Love")

Group performance: The Voice UK coaches - "Saturday Night's Alright for Fighting" (All coaches except Meghan Trainor)

Due to COVID-19 travel restrictions, Trainor was unable to perform with her artist, so Ella Eyre sang with Brooke Scullion.
The live final was pre-recorded.

References

External links
 Official website

Series 09
2020 British television seasons
Television productions suspended due to the COVID-19 pandemic